Poly(A) polymerase gamma is an enzyme that in humans is encoded by the PAPOLG gene.

This gene encodes a member of the poly(A) polymerase family which catalyzes template-independent extension of the 3' end of a DNA/RNA strand. This enzyme shares 60% identity to the well characterized poly(A) polymerase II (PAPII) at the amino acid level. These two enzymes have similar organization of structural and functional domains. This enzyme is exclusively localized in the nucleus and exhibits both nonspecific and CPSF (cleavage and polyadenylation specificity factor)/AAUAAA-dependent polyadenylation activity. This gene is located on chromosome 2 in contrast to the PAPII gene, which is located on chromosome 14.

References

Further reading